Oxalobacter vibrioformis is an oxalate-degrading anaerobic bacterium that was isolated from anoxic freshwater sediments. O. vibrioformis is a Gram-negative, non-spore-forming, motile, vibrioid rod which belongs to the genus Oxalobacter. O. vibrioformis uses oxalate and oxamate as its sole source of energy and acetate as its main source of carbon.

References

External links
Type strain of Oxalobacter vibrioformis at BacDive -  the Bacterial Diversity Metadatabase

Burkholderiales